

75001–75100 

|-id=009
| 75009 Petervereš || 1999 UC || Peter Vereš (born 1982), a Slovak astronomer at the Minor Planet Center. He graduated from Comenius University in Bratislava, observed at Modra Observatory, co-discovered many asteroids and comets with the Pan-STARRS survey (he is not directly credited as a discoverer), and simulated near-Earth object discoveries with the LSST at JPL (Src). || 
|-id=058
| 75058 Hanau ||  || The German city of Hanau, famous as the birthplace of the Brothers Grimm || 
|-id=063
| 75063 Koestler ||  || Arthur Koestler (1905–1983), a Hungarian British author and journalist || 
|-id=072
| 75072 Timerskine ||  || Timothy Joseph Erskine (born 1959), American needle safety technologist, amateur astronomer, musician, artist, and philanthropist || 
|}

75101–75200 

|-id=190
| 75190 Segreliliana ||  || Asteroid 75190 honors Auschwitz survivor Liliana Segre (born 1930) who holds the same concentration camp number. In January 2018, she was appointed Senator for life by the Italian President for the poignant testimony as a captive child in the Nazi concentration camps during World War II. She devoted her life to witnessing and increasing awareness of the Holocaust so that it does not happen again. || 
|}

75201–75300 

|-id=223
| 75223 Wupatki ||  || Wupatki pueblo served as a cultural and trade center situated in one of the warmest driest places on the Colorado Plateau in northern Arizona. The red rock walls originally contained 100 rooms, a community room and ball court. It was built by the Ancient Pueblo People some 800 years ago. || 
|-id=225
| 75225 Corradoaugias ||  || Corrado Augias (born 1935) is an Italian journalist, writer, author and TV host. || 
|}

75301–75400 

|-id=308
| 75308 Shoin ||  || Yoshida Shōin (1830–1859), a Japanese political scientist, executed for his anti-shogunate ideology, and whose teachings played an important role in the success of the Meiji Restoration || 
|}

75401–75500 

|-bgcolor=#f2f2f2
| colspan=4 align=center | 
|}

75501–75600 

|-id=555
| 75555 Wonaszek ||  || Antal Wonaszek (1871–1902), a Hungarian astronomer and director of the Kiskartal Observatory during 1897–1902. His main field of research was the observation of clouds in Jupiter's atmosphere and the study of irregularities in Saturn's rings. He also made observations of the sun, moon and comets || 
|-id=562
| 75562 Wilkening ||  || Laurel L. Wilkening, (1944–2019), meteoriticist who served on numerous commissions related to the US space program. || 
|-id=564
| 75564 Audubon || 2000 AJ || John James Audubon (1785–1851), a Franco-American ornithologist, naturalist, and painter || 
|-id=569
| 75569 IRSOL ||  || IRSOL (Istituto Ricerche Solari Locarno or Solar Research Institute of Locarno), located in Locarno, Switzerland, is a leading observatory in the field of solar spectropolarimetry. It is associated with the University of Lugano (Src) || 
|-id=570
| 75570 Jenőwigner ||  || Eugene Wigner (1902–1995), a Hungarian-American physicist and Nobelist. This minor planet was discovered on the fifth anniversary of his death. || 
|-id=591
| 75591 Stonemose ||  || Vickie Stone Moseley (born 1957) is a friend and partner of Alan Hale. She inadvertently "re-discovered" this asteroid while examining images of (4151) Alanhale that were taken during the course of developing an international educational program on the small bodies of the solar system. || 
|}

75601–75700 

|-bgcolor=#f2f2f2
| colspan=4 align=center | 
|}

75701–75800 

|-bgcolor=#f2f2f2
| colspan=4 align=center | 
|}

75801–75900 

|-id=823
| 75823 Csokonai ||  || Mihály Csokonai Vitéz (1773–1805) was one of the greatest Hungarian poets. His works reflect great knowledge of philosophy, politics and the arts of his time. This minor planet was discovered on the 195th anniversary of his death. || 
|-id=829
| 75829 Alyea ||  || Gerald "Gerry" Alyea (1932–2010), a founder of the Warren Astronomical Society in Michigan. || 
|-id=836
| 75836 Warrenastro ||  || The Warren Astronomical Society in suburban Detroit Michigan, is a long-lived, very active and well educated club. Over the years a number of their members have gone on to careers in professional astronomy. They maintain an observatory at Camp Rotary in Rochester, Michigan, the site of many public star parties. || 
|-id=837
| 75837 Johnbriol ||  || John Briol (born 1955) is a dedicated amateur astronomer who has contributed thousands of asteroid observations to the OSIRIS-REx Target Asteroids! citizen science program and Target NEOs! Astronomical League Observing Program. || 
|-id=841
| 75841 Brendahuettner ||  || Brenda Huettner (born 1960) is a dedicated OSIRIS-REx Ambassador assisting the University of Arizona's Lunar and Planetary Laboratory with public events. || 
|-id=842
| 75842 Jackmonahan ||  || Jack Monahan (born 1945) is a Navy veteran, science and math teacher and a dedicated OSIRIS-REx Ambassador who assists the University of Arizona's, Lunar and Planetary Laboratory with public events. || 
|-id=844
| 75844 Rexadams ||  || Rex Adams (born 1945) was a researcher, educator and curator at the University of Arizona's Laboratory of Tree Ring Research for 35 years. He taught numerous students and researchers methods developed by astronomer A. E. Douglass. In 2016 he received the Richard L. Holmes Award for Outstanding Service to Dendrochronology. || 
|-id=846
| 75846 Jandorf ||  || Harold "Hal" Jandorf (born 1948) is a well-liked professor of astronomy at Los Angeles Valley College in Valley Glen, California. He is also adjunct faculty at Moorpark College in California, has authored several editions of Experiences in Astronomy and is a popular outreach speaker with the Ventura County Astronomical Society. || 
|-id=852
| 75852 Elgie || 2000 CY || Joseph Henry Elgie (1864–1937) was an astronomy popularizer, who was elected a Fellow of the Royal Astronomical Society in 1905 and member of the British Astronomical Association in 1910. He wrote seven books on astronomy and the weather, and made radio broadcasts on the BBC in the 1920s. || 
|}

75901–76000 

|-id=969
| 75969 Backhouse ||  || Thomas William Backhouse (1842–1920) had an observatory on the roof of his house in Sunderland, England. He observed meteors, variable stars, novae, aurorae, Zodiacal Light, Green Flash, Gegenschein, comets and eclipses (including four total solar). In 1858 he began his "astronomical journal" diary, which ran for 36 volumes. || 
|-id=970
| 75970 Olcott ||  || William Tyler Olcott (1873–1936) was an American lawyer, amateur astronomer and co-founder of the American Association of Variable Star Observers. He wrote a number of popular books on astronomy including Star Lore-Myths, Legends and Facts and A Field Book of the Skies. || 
|-id=971
| 75971 Unkingalls ||  || Albert Graham Ingalls (Albert "Unk" Ingalls, 1888–1958) helped father amateur telescope making in the United States in the 1920s ushering in an era of amateur astronomy. He published many articles in Scientific American and was the editor of Amateur Telescope Making which was responsible for the construction of thousands of telescopes. || 
|-id=972
| 75972 Huddleston ||  || Marvin Huddleston (born 1955) is an amateur astronomer living in Mesquite, Texas. He is a member of the Association of Lunar and Planetary Observers, the Royal Astronomical Society of London and a storm spotter with the meteorological group "Texas Coccorahs". || 
|}

References 

075001-076000